White Place Historic District may refer to:
White Place Historic District (Illinois), Bloomington, Illinois
White Place Historic District (Massachusetts), Brookline, Massachusetts